MRBS may refer to :
Mean Rounds Between Stoppages, a military abbreviation describing a test used notably for the M240 machine gun development
Medical rural bonded scholarship, a program intended to increase the number of doctors practising in rural and remote regions of Australia
Member of the Royal British Society of Sculptors
Meeting Room Booking System, MRBS is a booking system to book any resource